Alex D. Rogers is professor of conservation biology and fellow of Somerville College, University of Oxford.

References

External links
Alex Rogers talking at the World Economic Forum on Preserving Ocean Ecosystems.

English biologists
Fellows of Somerville College, Oxford
Alumni of the University of Liverpool
Living people
Year of birth missing (living people)